The Colonial Secretary of Western Australia was one of the most important and powerful public offices in Western Australia, in the time when Western Australia was a British colony.  The Colonial Secretary was the representative of the British Colonial Office in Western Australia, and was usually appointed from Britain.  He was responsible for all official correspondence between the colony and the Colonial Office.  He was at all times a member of the Western Australian Legislative Council and the Western Australian Executive Council.

After Western Australia gained responsible government in 1890, the office of Colonial Secretary became a ministerial portfolio.  The responsibilities of the office changed substantially, and it was no longer such an important role.  Colebatch (2004) described the office of Colonial Secretary in 1917 as

Since Western Australia was no longer a British colony after 1901, the office of Colonial Secretary was misnamed after this date. In 1924, the office was renamed to Chief Secretary.

List of colonial secretaries of Western Australia

The following is a list of colonial secretaries of Western Australia:

Notes

References
 Colebatch, H. G. P. (2004).  Steadfast Knight: A Life of Sir Hal Colebatch.  Fremantle Arts Centre Press, Fremantle, Western Australia.  .

Further reading
 Battye, J. S. (1912) The Cyclopedia of Western Australia Perth : Cyclopedia Co., 1912.
 Entry as: Colonial Secretary's Department : list of gentlemen who have held the position of Colonial Secretary for Western Australia from 1890 to 1911. Vol. 1, p. 502

Facsimile edition: (1985) The Cyclopedia of Western Australia : an historical and commercial review : descriptive and biographical facts, figures and illustrations : an epitome of progress Carlisle, W.A : Hesperian Press.  (set)  (vol. 2)  (vol. 1)